Sieglinde Maria Ahrens (born 19 February 1936, in Berlin) is a German organist and composer. She is the daughter of (Johannes Clemens) Joseph Ahrens (1904–1997), a German composer and organist. Ahrens studied music and composition under her father.  After she completed her studies, she was an organist of Salvator-Kirche and professor of organ at Essen.  She is author of a book on Messiaen organ music Das Orgelwerk Messiaens, Gilles u. Francke (1968), ASIN: B0007JD6XM.

Works
Selected works include:
DREI GESÄNGE NACH LATEINISCHEN PSALMTEXTEN (1963) Bass solo, Organ
FANTASIE (1958) Organ
SONATE (1957) Violin, Organ
SUITE (1959) Organ

Aherns' work has been issued on CD including:
Das Heilige Jahr - Orgelopus Von Joseph Ahrens by Sieglinde Ahrens and Joseph Ahrens (Audio CD)
Eben - Organ Works by Petr Eben, Sieglinde Ahrens, and Martin Lenniger (Audio CD - 1992)
Petr Eben - Organ Work by Petr Eben, Sieglinde Ahrens, and Rudolf Lodenkemper (Audio CD - 1993)
Orgelwerke by Sieglinde Ahrens and Petr Eben (Audio CD)

References

1936 births
20th-century classical composers
German classical composers
German classical organists
German women composers
Living people
Pupils of Darius Milhaud
Women classical composers
Women organists
20th-century German composers
21st-century organists
21st-century women musicians
20th-century women composers